Early Spring is a 1986 Danish drama film directed by Astrid Henning-Jensen. It was entered into the 15th Moscow International Film Festival. The film is based on the novel of the same name by Tove Ditlevsen.

Cast
 Sofie Gråbøl as Ester
 Carl Quist Møller as Carl
 Vigga Bro as Ester's mother
 Torben Jensen as Ester's father
 Louise Fribo as Lisa (as Louise Fribo Eriksen)
 Kirsten Lehfeldt as Frøken Thomsen (Miss Thomsen)
 Else Petersen as Miss Thomsen's mother
 Lene Vasegaard as the teacher (Lærerinden)
 Benny Poulsen as the teacher Banana (Lærer 'bananen')
 John Hahn-Petersen as Street Policeman (Gadebetjent)
 Birgit Conradi as School Nurse (Skolesundhedsplejerske)
 Margrethe Koytu as a cleaning lady (Vaskekone)

References

External links
 

1986 films
1986 drama films
Danish drama films
1980s Danish-language films
Films directed by Astrid Henning-Jensen